Le jour et la nuit may refer to:

 La jour et la nuit (opera), an 1881 opéra-bouffe by Charles Lecocq
"Le jour et la nuit": a track on the album Traffic by Gaëtan Roussel
 Day and Night (1997 film)